Pythius  may refer to:

Pythius, a historical Lydian
Pythius of Priene, a Greek architect 
Pythius, a synonym of Euphorbia
Pythius, an epithet of Apollo

See also
Pythias (disambiguation)
Pytheas (4th century BC), Greek explorer from modern day Marseilles
Pytheas (crater), a lunar crater